7F or 7-F can refer to:

 IATA code for First Air
 Vought YA-7F attack aircraft 
 VE-7F, a model of Vought VE-7
 TRANSYT-7F traffic simulation and signal timing optimization program
 S&DJR 7F  2-8-0, or Somerset and Dorset Joint Railway (S&DJR) 7F 2-8-0
 AL-7F, a model of Lyulka AL-7
 AIM-7F, a model of AIM-7 Sparrow
 7F, the hexadecimal value for DEL in binary to ASCII conversion.
 7F, the production code for the 1987 Doctor Who serial Delta and the Bannermen

See also
F7 (disambiguation)